The International Cannabinoid Research Society (ICRS) is a professional society for scientific research in all fields of the cannabinoids, based in North Carolina, US.  ICRS is one of the very few global non-profit medical societies or associations related to cannabis and cannabinoids.

History
The ICRS was formally incorporated as a scientific research society in 1992. Prior to that, early ICRS Symposia were organized by various researchers in the field since 1970. Membership in the Society has risen from 50 original members in its first year to 650+ members from all over the world.

Work
The International Cannabinoid Research Society is a:

Non-political, non-religious organization dedicated to scientific research in all fields of the cannabinoids, ranging from biochemical, chemical and physiological studies of the endogenous cannabinoid system to studies of the abuse potential of recreational Cannabis. 
In addition to acting as a source for impartial information on Cannabis and the cannabinoids, the main role of the ICRS is to provide an open forum for researchers to meet and discuss their research.

Mission 
The mission of the ICRS is to:

Foster cannabinoid research; 
promote the exchange of scientific information and perspectives about Cannabis, the cannabinoids and endocannabinoids through the organization of scientific meetings; 
serve as a source of reliable information regarding the chemistry, pharmacology, therapeutic uses, toxicology and the behavioral, psychological, and social effects of Cannabis and its constituents, of synthetic and endogenous compounds that interact with cannabinoid receptors, and of any compounds that target other components of the endocannabinoid system.

Journal 
Since 2019, the ICRS partners with Mary Ann Liebert, Inc. Publishers to edit the academic journal Cannabis and Cannabinoid Research along with the International Association for Cannabinoid Medicines.

Awards
ICRS awards the "Raphael Mechoulam Award in Cannabinoid Research" annually.

Annual Symposia
The Society holds an annual meeting, not available to the media, which generally alternates between North America and Europe.

Notes

References

External links
Official Website
ICRS Annual Symposium On The Cannabinoids

Neuroscience organizations
Pharmacological societies
Toxicology organizations
International learned societies
Cannabis research
1992 in cannabis
501(c)(3) organizations